Trent Aaron Copeland (born 14 March 1986) is an Australian cricket player and commentator. He is a right-arm fast bowler who currently plays first-class cricket for New South Wales. He made his Test debut for Australia against Sri Lanka in August 2011.

Cricket
Originally from Bathurst, Trent Copeland began his career as a wicketkeeper at St George Cricket Club. In a third grade game, with the front-line bowlers exhausted, St George turned to Copeland needing 4 wickets for a win, with the close of play 10 minutes away. Copeland took 4/1 from 2 overs. Following this performance, Copeland quickly came up through the ranks of St George, and was the second highest wicket-taker with 61 at 16.62 in the Sydney Grade competition in 2008–09.

He made his first class debut for NSW against Queensland at the Sydney Cricket Ground on 27 January 2010 and took a remarkable 8/92 in the first innings. It was the second-best figures in a maiden first-class fixture for New South Wales. Copeland took an impressive 35 wickets at 17.57 in a remarkable, debut Sheffield Shield season. Despite playing just 5 games he was the third highest wicket taker behind only Ben Cutting and Peter George who both played the full 10 games – twice as many as Copeland. He was named in the ACA four-day team of the year two seasons in a row 2009/10 and 2010/11. Copeland replaced Doug Bollinger in the Sydney Thunder Big Bash squad, and his stocks continued to rise.

Copeland won the Allan Border Medal – Bradman Young Cricketer of the Year 2010. He was named in the Australia A four-day and one-day squads to tour Zimbabwe in July 2011, and was subsequently named in the Test squad to tour Sri Lanka in August 2011.

Copeland made his Test debut for Australia in Galle, Sri Lanka, he had his baggy Green cap presented to him by Doug Walters. He picked up the wicket of Sri Lankan opener Tillakaratne Dilshan, whose wicket he would claim twice more in 5 innings. He scored a vital 23* in the second innings of his debut Test, achieving the fourth-highest score in the innings.

In 2018, Copeland joined the Seven Network as an analyst for the network's Test cricket coverage, after having previously done radio commentary with ABC Grandstand.

Copeland hosted 7Mate's coverage of the 2020 Tokyo Olympics.

Other achievements
Aside from his cricketing career, Copeland also represented the Australian College of Physical Education, often being selected for the highly competitive Australian University Games team. Trent represented ACPE at baseball and touch football, and is a scratch golfer having once scored a hole in one on the 7th hole at Royal Sydney GC . Trent is a world class negotiator, which he has parlayed into being excellent fantasy basketball player.

Personal life
Copeland is married to former Australian Diamonds and Giants Netball netballer, Kimberlee Green.

References

External links
 

1986 births
Living people
People from the Central Tablelands
Australian cricketers
Cricketers from New South Wales
Australia Test cricketers
New South Wales cricketers
Northamptonshire cricketers
Sydney Thunder cricketers
Sydney Sixers cricketers
Australian cricket commentators